Nelson Symonds (September 24, 1933 – October 11, 2008) was a Canadian jazz guitarist born in Upper Hammonds Plains, Nova Scotia.

Biography
After pursuing the banjo at a young age, Symonds switched to the guitar.  He gained his first performance experience touring on a travelling carnival from 1955 to 1958 throughout the United States. Upon returning to Canada, Symonds settled in Montreal in 1958 and played in the group 'The Stablemates' led by Alfie Wade Jr.

During the 1960s and 1970s Symonds played mainly with bassist Charlie Biddle and drummer Norman Marshall Villeneuve at venues such as The Black Bottom and Rockhead's Paradise.  During the 1970s, Symonds and Biddle performed as a duo in numerous Laurentian resorts.  Throughout his 30-plus year career, he played at all of the major jazz venues in Montreal including Upstairs, Biddles and Cafe La Bohème among others.

Symonds reportedly resisted recording until the 1990s, cutting three collaborative albums, and one as leader.

Symonds played a Gretsch Sal Salvador model guitar.

Symonds died in Montreal, Quebec due to a heart attack at the age of 75, twelve years after undergoing a quadruple bypass that put an end to his musical career.

Discography

As leader

Getting Personal, (Justin Time Records, 1992)

As featured soloist

 Bernard Primeau Jazz Ensemble, Reunion (Amplitude, 1990)
 Dave Turner Quartet, Live - Thank You For Your Hospitality (DSM, 1995)
 Dave Turner / Nelson Symonds, The Pulse Brothers (DSM, 1997)

Filmography
Symonds is the subject of two short documentary films by Mary Ellen Davis
Nelson Symonds Jazz Guitarist, (1984)
Nelson Symonds Quartet, (1984)

Awards
1996: Oscar Peterson Prix De Jazz Award, Montreal Jazz Festival

Further reading
Jazz in Canada: Fourteen Lives, Mark Miller, Nightwood Editions, 1988, 
Who's Who of Jazz in Montreal: Ragtime to 1970, John Gilmore, Véhicule Press, 1989, 
Swinging in Paradise: The Story of Jazz in Montreal, John Gilmore, Véhicule Press, 1988,

References

1933 births
2008 deaths
Canadian jazz guitarists
Canadian male guitarists
20th-century Canadian guitarists
20th-century Canadian male musicians
Canadian male jazz musicians
Justin Time Records artists